Cycas schumanniana is a species of cycad endemic to New Guinea.

Range
It is found in northern New Guinea along the foothills of the Bismarck Range, where it is found in the valleys of the Markham River, Ramu River, and Bulolo River watersheds as far as Wau, Papua New Guinea.

References

schumanniana
Endemic flora of New Guinea